Burst mode may refer to:

Science and technology
 Burst mode (computing), a data transmission mode
 Burst mode (weapon), a firing mode
 Burst mode (photography), a camera mode
 Bursting or burst mode, a mode in neurons

Other uses
 Burst mode, a type of creature in Digimon Data Squad in the Digimon fictional universe